The 1988–89 Iowa State Cyclones men's basketball team represented Iowa State University during the 1988–89 NCAA Division I men's basketball season. The Cyclones were coached by Johnny Orr, who was in his 9th season. They played their home games at Hilton Coliseum in Ames, Iowa.

They finished the season 17–12, 7–7 in Big Eight play to finish in 5th place. They earned an at-large bid to the NCAA tournament as the #10 seed in the Southeast region. The Cyclones lost to UCLA in the opening round of the tournament.

Roster

Schedule and results

|-
!colspan=6 style=""|Exhibition

|-
!colspan=6 style=""|Regular Season

|-
!colspan=6 style=""|Exhibition

|-
!colspan=6 style=""|Regular Season

|-
!colspan=6 style=""|Exhibition

|-
!colspan=6 style=""|Regular Season

|-
!colspan=12 style=""|Big Eight tournament

|-
!colspan=9 style=""|NCAA Tournament

|-

References

Iowa State Cyclones men's basketball seasons
Iowa State
Iowa State
Iowa State Cyc
Iowa State Cyc